Brassey is a surname. Notable people with the surname include:

Albert Brassey (1844–1918), British rower, soldier and Conservative politician
Anna Brassey (née Allnutt) (1839–1887), English traveller and writer
Baron Brassey of Apethorpe (Northampton), title in the Peerage of the United Kingdom
Bill Brassey, English bare-knuckle boxer
Earl Brassey, title in the Peerage of the United Kingdom
Harold Brassey, British polo champion
Henry Brassey (1840–1891), British Member of Parliament
Henry Brassey, 1st Baron Brassey of Apethorpe (1870–1958), British Conservative politician
Hugh Trefusis Brassey (1915–1990), British soldier and magistrate
Nathaniel Brassey (c. 1697–1765), British banker and politician
Nathaniel Brassey Halhed (1751–1830), English Orientalist and philologist
Robert Bingham Brassey (1875–1946), British Conservative Party politician
Rowan Brassey (born 1956), New Zealand lawn bowls player
Thomas Brassey (1805–1870), English civil engineering contractor and manufacturer of building materials
Thomas Brassey, 1st Earl Brassey (1836–1918), British Liberal Party politician
Thomas Brassey, 2nd Earl Brassey (1863–1919), editor of The Naval Annual

See also
Brassey's Naval Annual
Brassey Green, village in Cheshire, England
Brassey SSSI, nature reserve in Gloucestershire, England
Peto, Brassey and Betts, civil engineering partnership between Samuel Morton Peto, Thomas Brassey and Edward Betts